Guilherme Lorena (1894 – 14 June 1949) was a Brazilian rower. He competed in the men's coxed four event at the 1920 Summer Olympics.

References

External links
 

1894 births
1949 deaths
Brazilian male rowers
Olympic rowers of Brazil
Rowers at the 1920 Summer Olympics
Place of birth missing